This inclusive list of North American opera companies contains American and Canadian professional opera companies and opera related organizations with entries in the Wikipedia. For opera companies in Latin America (including Mexico) see List of Latin American and South American opera companies. For opera companies from other countries, see List of opera companies.

Canada

Alberta

Calgary Opera 
Edmonton Opera

British Columbia

Opera Pro Cantanti, Vancouver
Vancouver Opera
City Opera of Vancouver
Pacific Opera Victoria
Vancouver Concert Opera Co-Operative (VanCOCO)
Opera di Concertisti e Meraviglie, Vancouver

Manitoba
Manitoba Opera, Winnipeg

Ontario

Canadian Children's Opera Company
Canadian Opera Company, Toronto
 Centuries Opera Association, Toronto
Opera Atelier, Toronto
 Opera in Concert, Toronto
Tapestry Opera, Toronto
Toronto City Opera
Against the Grain Theatre (AtG), Toronto

Quebec

Opéra de Montréal
Opéra de Québec

Saskatchewan
Saskatoon Opera

United States

Alabama

Mobile Opera
Opera Birmingham

Alaska

Anchorage Opera
Fairbanks Light Opera Theatre
Juneau Lyric Opera Association
Opera Fairbanks

Arizona

Arizona Opera, Phoenix and Tucson
Phoenix Opera

Arkansas

Opera Fayetteville
Opera in the Ozarks at Inspiration Point
Opera in the Rock
Ozark Family Opera Company
Wildwood Park for the Performing Arts

California

Berkeley Chamber Opera
California Opera Association
Capitol Opera Sacramento
Celestial Opera Company
Cinnabar Opera Theater
Center Stage Opera
Festival Opera
First Look Sonoma
Gallo Center for the Arts
Goat Hall Productions
Golden Gate Opera
Independent Opera Company, Los Angeles
Lamplighters Music Theatre
Livermore Valley Opera
Long Beach Opera
Los Angeles Civic Light Opera
Los Angeles Metropolitan Opera
Los Angeles Opera
Lyric Opera of Los Angeles
Lyric Opera San Diego
Martinez Opera
Merola Opera Program
Music Academy of the West
Musical Traditions
North Bay Opera
Oakland Opera Theater
Opera a la Carte
Opera Pacific (closed November 2008)
Opera Pasadena
Opera Parallèle, San Francisco
Opera Royale
Opera San José
Opera San Luis Obispo
Opera Santa Barbara
Pacific Opera Project
Pacific Repertory Opera
Pocket Opera
Repertory Opera Company
Riverside Lyric Opera
Sacramento Opera
San Diego Opera
San Francisco Lyric Opera
San Francisco Opera
Stockton Opera Association
The Industry
Townsend Opera Players
Tyrolean Opera Program
Verismo Opera
Visalia Opera Company
West Bay Opera Association
West Edge Opera

Colorado

Aspen Music Festival
Boulder Opera Company
Central City Opera
Crested Butte Music Festival
Empire Lyric Players
Loveland Opera Theatre
Opera Colorado
Opera Fort Collins
Opera Theatre of the Rockies
Rocky Mountain Opera

Connecticut

Connecticut Grand Opera and Orchestra
Connecticut Lyric Opera
Connecticut Opera (closed in Feb 2009)
Hartford Opera Theater
Hartford Wagner Festival
Hillhouse Opera Company
Opera Connecticut
Opera Theater of Connecticut
Salt Marsh Opera
Yale Baroque Opera Project

Delaware

Opera Delaware

District of Columbia

Bel Cantanti Opera
Maryland Lyric Opera
Opera Camerata of Washington
Opera Lafayette
DC Public Opera
Summer Opera Theatre Company(closed January 2010)
Washington Concert Opera
Washington National Opera
Washington Savoyards

Florida

Central Florida Lyric Opera
Florida Grand Opera
Hispanic-American Lyric Theatre
Miami Lyric Opera
New Century Opera
Opera del Sol
Opera Jacksonville
Opera Naples
Opera Tampa
Opera Theater of Lakeland
Opera Orlando
Orlando Opera 
Palm Beach Opera
Pensacola Opera
Sarasota Opera
St. Petersburg Opera Company

Georgia

The Atlanta Opera
Augusta Opera
Americolor Opera Alliance
Capitol City Opera
Moon River Opera
Peach State Opera
See also Opera in Atlanta

Hawaii
Hawaii Opera Theatre
Hawaii Youth Opera Chorus

Idaho
Idaho Falls Opera Theatre
North Idaho Friends of the Opera and the Arts Inc.
Opera Idaho

Illinois

Bowen Park Opera Company
Chicago Opera Theater
da Corneto Opera 
DuPage Opera Theatre
Haymarket Opera Company
Light Opera Works
Lyric Opera of Chicago
Muddy River Opera Company
Opera Illinois

Indiana
Indianapolis Opera
Indiana University Opera, Jacobs School of Music, Bloomington
South Bend Lyric Opera

Iowa
Cedar Rapids Opera Theatre
Des Moines Metro Opera

Kansas
OperaKansas
Wichita Grand Opera
 Lawrence Opera Theatre

Kentucky
Kentucky Opera

Louisiana

Jefferson Performing Arts Society
New Orleans Opera
Opera Louisiane
Shreveport Opera

Maine
PORTopera, Portland

Maryland

American Opera Theater
Annapolis Opera
Baltimore Opera Company (closed March 2009)
Bel Cantanti Opera
Baltimore Concert Opera
Maryland Opera
Opera International

Massachusetts

Acting Singers Project 
Berkshire Opera Company (closed 2009)
Boston Lyric Opera 
Boston Metro Opera (closed 2015)
Boston Early Music Festival
Boston Opera Collaborative
Cape Cod Opera 
Commonwealth Lyric Theater
Commonwealth Opera
Helios Early Opera
Longwood Opera
Lowell House Opera, the oldest still-performing opera company in New England
MetroWest Opera
Odyssey Opera
Opera Boston (closed 2011)
Opera del West
OperaHub
Guerilla Opera

Michigan

Detroit Opera
Traverse City Opera
Opera Grand Rapids
Opera MODO

Minnesota

Lyric Opera of the North (LOON Opera Company)
Minnesota Concert Opera (closed 2017)
Minnesota Opera
Nautilus Music-Theater
Skylark Opera Theatre
Arbeit Opera Theatre
Really Spicy Opera

Mississippi

Mississippi Opera
Natchez Festival of Music

Missouri

Kansas City Metro Opera
Lyric Opera of Kansas City
Opera Theatre of Saint Louis
Springfield Regional Opera
Heartland Opera Theatre
Union Avenue Opera
Winter Opera Saint Louis

Montana

Montana Lyric Opera
Rimrock Opera
Intermountain Opera/Opera Bozeman

Nebraska
Opera Omaha
Nebraska Opera Project

Nevada
Nevada Opera
Opera Las Vegas
Vegas City Opera

New Hampshire

Granite State Opera (closed April 2009)
Opera New Hampshire
Opera North
Raylynmor Opera

New Jersey

Boheme Opera New Jersey
Eastern Opera of New Jersey
Garden State Philharmonic
Light Opera of New Jersey
The Little Opera Company of New Jersey
New Jersey Concert Opera
New Jersey Opera Theater
Opera Seabrook
Opera Theatre of Montclair

New Mexico
Opera Southwest, Albuquerque
Santa Fe Opera

New York

Amato Opera (closed 2009)
American Lyric Theater
American Opera Projects
American Savoyards (closed 1967)
Amore Opera
Apotheosis Opera
Bare Opera
Bronx Opera
Brooklyn Academy of Music Opera
Cantiamo Opera Theater
Capitol Opera Albany-Saratoga
Center for Contemporary Opera
Chautauqua Opera
Chelsea Opera
Delaware Valley Opera Company
Dicapo Opera (Closed 2015)
Empire Opera
Encompass New Opera Theatre
Finger Lakes Opera
Family Opera Initiative
The Gilbert and Sullivan Light Opera Company of Long Island
Glimmerglass Opera
Gotham Chamber Opera (closed 2015)
Heartbeat Opera
Hubbard Hall Opera Theater
Hudson Lyric Opera
Hudson Opera Theatre
La Gran Scena Opera Company
Opera Saratoga, formerly Lake George Opera
Liederkranz Opera Theater
Light Opera of Manhattan (closed 1992)
Little Opera Theatre of New York
Loft Opera
Long Island Opera Company
Mercury Opera Rochester
Metropolitan Opera, The
Millennial Arts Productions
New Camerata Opera
New Opera Company
New Rochelle Opera
New York City Opera (closed October 2013, reopened January 2016)
New York Gilbert and Sullivan Players
New York Grand Opera Company
New York Opera Forum
New York Opera Project
Opera Company of Brooklyn
Opera Ebony
Opera Manhattan
Opera on Tap
Opera Orchestra of New York
Opera Saratoga
Oswego Opera Theatre
PALA Opera Association
Regina Opera Company
Riverside Opera Ensemble
Seagle Music Colony
Syracuse Opera
Taconic Opera
Teatro Grattacielo
Teatro Nuovo
Tri-Cities Opera Company
Vertical Player Repertory
Vocal Productions NYC

North Carolina

Asheville Lyric Opera
North Carolina Opera
Greensboro Opera Company
Opera Carolina
Opera Wilmington
Piedmont Opera
Capitol Opera Raleigh
Durham Savoyards
Janiec Opera Company at the Brevard Music Center
The A. J. Fletcher Opera Institute at the University of North Carolina School of the Arts

North Dakota
Fargo-Moorhead Opera

Ohio

Cincinnati Opera
Cincinnati Chamber Opera
The Cleveland Opera
Cleveland Opera Theater
Dayton Opera
Opera Columbus
Opera Project Columbus
Opera Western Reserve
North American New Opera Workshop (Cincinnati)
Toledo Opera

Oklahoma

Light Opera Oklahoma closed 2013
Tulsa Opera
Cimarron Opera
Painted Sky Opera

Oregon

Opera Bend
Brava! Opera, Medford
Eugene Opera
Portland Opera
Rogue Opera, Medford

Pennsylvania

Amici Opera
Center City Opera Theater
ConcertOPERA Philadelphia
Microscopic Opera Company
Opera Philadelphia (formerly Opera Company of Philadelphia)
OperaLancaster
Opera North (Philadelphia)
Pittsburgh Festival Opera (formerly Opera Theater of Pittsburgh)
Pittsburgh Opera
Pittsburgh Savoyards
Resonance Works Pittsburgh
Savoy Company

Puerto Rico
Opera de Puerto Rico

Rhode Island
Opera Providence

South Carolina

Greenville Light Opera Works (GLOW)
Opera Charleston
Palmetto Opera
Spoleto Festival USA
South Carolina Opera Company

Tennessee

Chattanooga Symphony and Opera
Knoxville Opera
Marble City Opera (Knoxville, Tennessee)
Nashville Opera Association
Opera Memphis

Texas

Abilene Opera Association
Amarillo Opera
Austin Opera
Dallas Opera
El Paso Opera
Fort Worth Opera
Houston Grand Opera
Lone Star Lyric Theater Festival
Lyric Opera of Waco
Opera East Texas
Opera in the Heights
Opera Vista
Regal Opera
Opera Piccola of San Antonio

Utah

Utah Festival Opera & Musical Theatre
Utah Symphony and Opera

Vermont

Green Mountain Opera Festival
Opera Company of Middlebury
Opera Theatre of Weston
Vermont Opera Theater

Virginia

Charlottesville Opera, previously known as Ash Lawn Opera
Aurora Opera (formerly the Opera Theatre of Northern Virginia)
Bay View Music Festival 
Capital City Opera
Opera in Williamsburg
Opera Music Theater International
Opera on the James 
Opera Roanoke 
River City Opera 
Virginia Opera
Wolf Trap Opera Company
Castleton Festival

Washington

Bellevue Opera
Black Box Opera Theater 
Lyric Opera Northwest]
Puget Sound Concert Opera
Puget Sound Opera
Seattle Opera 
Skagit Opera 
Spokane Coeur d'Alene Opera 
Tacoma Opera
Vashon Opera
Vespertine Opera
Washington East Opera

Wisconsin

Florentine Opera 
Madison Opera
Fresco Opera Theatre 
Milwaukee Opera Theatre
Opera for the Young 
Skylight Opera Theatre

References

Opera-related lists
 
Opera companies
Opera companies